Federico Agustín Gattoni (born 16 February 1999) is an Argentine professional footballer who plays as a centre-back for San Lorenzo.

Club career
Gattoni spent his early years at local team Club Chacabuco, before signing for San Lorenzo at the age of seven. He made his breakthrough into first-team football in October 2020, appearing for his senior debut in a goalless draw away to Argentinos Juniors in the Copa de la Liga Profesional on 31 October. He had been an unused substitute once in each of the preceding two years; for a 2018 Copa Sudamericana loss to Deportes Temuco and for a 2019 Primera División win over Godoy Cruz, with a debut being further delayed due to serious cruciate injuries suffered in both knees in 2017 and 2018.

Gattoni scored his first senior goal on 14 November 2020 against Aldosivi.

International career
Gattoni was called up to train with the Argentine senior squad during a tour of Asia/Oceania in June 2017. Two years later, he represented his nation at the 2018 COTIF Tournament; which they won.

Career statistics
.

Honours
Argentina U18
 COTIF Tournament: 2018

Notes

References

External links

1999 births
Living people
Footballers from Buenos Aires
Argentine footballers
Argentina youth international footballers
Association football defenders
Argentine Primera División players
San Lorenzo de Almagro footballers
Argentine people of Italian descent